Matthias Baranowski (born 8 February 1967) is a former German footballer.

In 1987 Christoph Daum purchased Baranowski for 1. FC Köln, however, Baranowski failed to adapt to top-level Bundesliga football, having previously been on the books at Rot-Weiß Oberhausen.

His next teams have been then FC 08 Homburg, 1. FC Schweinfurt 05 and again FC 08 Homburg. His career ended playing for VfK Weddinghofen.

References

External links

1967 births
Living people
German footballers
Germany under-21 international footballers
Rot-Weiß Oberhausen players
1. FC Köln players
FC 08 Homburg players
1. FC Schweinfurt 05 players
Bundesliga players
2. Bundesliga players
Association football forwards